A "holier-than-thou" attitude is a form of self-righteousness.  The phrase originates from Isaiah 65:5 in the King James Bible, which says (spelling modernized): “Stand by thyself, come not near to me; for I am holier than thou”

Holier Than Thou may also refer to:

 Holier Than Thou (fanzine), a science fiction fanzine
 "Holier Than Thou" (song), a 1991 song by heavy metal band Metallica